The jambu fruit dove (Ptilinopus jambu) is a smallish colourful fruit dove. It is a resident breeding species in southern Thailand, Malaysia, Brunei and the Indonesian islands of Kalimantan, Sumatra and Java.

Taxonomy
The jambu fruit dove was formally described in 1789 by the German naturalist Johann Friedrich Gmelin in his revised and expanded edition of Carl Linnaeus's Systema Naturae. He placed it with all the other doves and pigeons in the genus Columba and coined the binomial name Columba jambu. Gmelin gave the locality as Java. He based his description on the "pooni-jamboo" that had been described in 1783 by the Irish orientalist William Marsden in his book The History of Sumatra.

The jambu fruit dove is now placed with nearly 60 other fruit doves in the genus Ptilinopus that was introduced in 1825 by the English naturalist William John Swainson. The genus name combines the Ancient Greek  meaning "feather" with  meaning "foot". The specific epithet jambu is from the Malay name for the species Punai jambu. In Sanskrit janbu is a rose apple tree. The species is monotypic: no subspecies are recognise.

Description

It is a plump small-headed bird with soft feathers and very distinctive colouring including a white eye ring, orange bill and red legs in both male and female birds.

The adult male has a crimson face with a black chin, unmarked dark green upperparts and ivory white underparts, with a pink patch on the breast and a chocolate brown undertail. The female differs from the male by having a dull purple face with a dark chin. The underparts are dull green with a white belly and cinnamon or buff undertail.

The immature jambu fruit dove resembles the female but has a green face. The young male acquires its full adult plumage in about 39 weeks from fledging. Immature males are similar in appearance to females. The call is a soft, low coo.

Distribution and habitat
The jambu fruit dove is found on the Malay Peninsula through Sumatra (including Riau Archipelago) and the islands of Nias, Bangka and Belitung) to Borneo and perhaps in west Java.

Behaviour and ecology
The jambu fruit dove is a shy and inconspicuous bird, camouflaged against the forest canopy by its green plumage. It is usually seen alone or in pairs, but a sizable flock may gather when feeding at a fruit tree. It eats fruit directly from the tree, or from the ground if items have been dropped by hornbills or monkeys. Like other doves, but unlike most birds, it can drink by sucking.

Breeding
The male holds a breeding territory, advertised by raising its wings, bobbing its body and cooing. It will defend its territory with a quick peck if the territorial display fails. The female builds a flimsy nest of twigs, roots and grasses, which are collected by her mate, in a tree and lays one or sometimes two white eggs which are incubated for about 20 days to hatching, with a further 12 or more days to fledging.

Conservation status
Extensive deforestation in Indonesia and Malaysia means that this dove is now threatened, although its ability to live in second growth and at higher elevation means that its situation is not as critical as that of some forest bird species. The jambu fruit dove is evaluated as Near Threatened on the IUCN Red List of Threatened Species.

References

External links 

 
 Jambu fruit dove at Blue Planet Biomes
 
 
 
 
 

jambu fruit dove
Birds of Malesia
Birds of Southeast Asia
Dove, Jambu fruit
Dove, Jambu fruit
jambu fruit dove
jambu fruit dove
Articles containing video clips
Taxobox binomials not recognized by IUCN